Joep is a Dutch masculine given name, the Limburgian form of Joseph. It is occasionally used as a feminine name. People with this name include:

Joep Baartmans-van den Boogaart (born 1939), Dutch female politician
Joep van Beeck (1930–2011), Dutch author and theologian
 (born 1946), Dutch political cartoonist
Joep Beving (born 1976), Dutch composer and pianist
 (1920–1988), Dutch football player and coach
 (1899–1975), Dutch road cyclist
Joep Franssens (born 1955), Dutch composer
Joep van 't Hek (born 1954), since 1973 spelled "Youp van 't Hek", Dutch comedian, author, and columnist
 (1908–1979), German concentration camp commander
Joep Lange (1954–2014), Dutch AIDS researcher 
Joep Leerssen (born 1955), Dutch comparatist and cultural historian
Joep van Liefland (born 1966), Dutch conceptual artist
Joep van Lieshout (born 1963), Dutch artist and sculptor
Joep de Mol (born 1995), Dutch field hockey player
Joep Nicolas (1897–1972), Dutch glass painter
Joep van den Ouweland (born 1984), Dutch footballer
Joep Packbiers (1875–1957), Dutch archer
Joep van de Rande (born 1997), Dutch footballer
 (1934–2004), Dutch composer and organist
Joep Zweegers (born 1992), Dutch footballer

See also
Joop

References

Dutch masculine given names